Fernando José Silva García (born 16 May 1977) is a retired footballer who played as a forward.

Born in Spain, he has represented the Andorra national team internationally.

Early life
Silva was born in Barcelona, Catalonia to Extremaduran parents and raised in Montijo.

International goals

Scores and results list Andorra's goal tally first.

References

External links
National team data

1977 births
Living people
People from Tierra de Mérida - Vegas Bajas
Sportspeople from the Province of Badajoz
Andorran footballers
Andorra international footballers
Spanish footballers
Spanish emigrants to Andorra
Naturalised citizens of Andorra
Andorran people of Spanish descent
Footballers from Extremadura
Association football forwards
Tercera División players
FC Andorra players
FC Santa Coloma players
CF Villanovense players
CD Badajoz players